Peyton-Jones or Peyton Jones may refer to:
Dame Julia Peyton-Jones (born 1952), British art director, OBE
Sir Simon Peyton Jones (born 1958), British computer scientist, OBE
Sir Tobias Grant Peyton-Jones,, OBE
Samuel "Fireman Sam" Peyton-Jones, the titular character of Fireman Sam

See also
Peyton (name)
Jones (surname)

Compound surnames
English-language surnames
Surnames of English origin